Henry Stebbins may refer to:
 Henry G. Stebbins (1811–1881), U.S. Representative from New York
 Henry E. Stebbins (1905–1973), US ambassador